Piazza Ferdinando Fuga, popularly known as piazzetta Fuga for its modest size and called during the fascist period piazza Franco Belfiore to commemorate a young fascist who fell fighting in a clash in 1921, is a square in Naples located in the Vomero district. It is dedicated to Ferdinando Fuga, the architect who made many of his main works in Naples, including the Girolamini church and the Real Albergo dei Poveri.

Historical notes and description 
The square has a triangular plan and via Cimarosa and via Lordi flow into it. In it we find three important buildings: the Central Funicular station, Palazzo Avena and the entrance to Villa Haas (Villa Palazzolo).

Transportation 
The square can be reached via the Central Funicular, of which it is the terminus. On the west side the square is connected with via Morghen by the stairs of via Cimarosa, equipped in 2002 with urban escalators built by the Municipality and managed by ANM.

Notes 

Piazzas in Naples